This is a list of films produced by the Telugu language film industry based in Hyderabad in the year 2001.

2001

January - June releases

July – December releases

References

2001
Telugu
 
2001 in Indian cinema